Adrian Bey (May 16, 1938 – July 2, 2019) was a Rhodesian-born American professional tennis player.

Bey was born and raised in Salisbury, Rhodesia and attended Prince Edward School.

Debuting on the international tour in the late 1950s, Bey was a member of the inaugural Rhodesia Davis Cup team and featured in a total of five ties in the competition. Bey won eight closed championships in Rhodesia and was the country's 1963 Sportsman of the Year. He twice made the round of 16 at the Wimbledon Championships, including in 1963 when he was beaten in four sets by second-seed Manuel Santana.

In the 1970s he immigrated to the United States and worked in Texas as a tennis pro for many years, living there until his death in 2019. He was a 2010 inductee in the Texas Tennis Hall of Fame.

See also
List of Rhodesia Davis Cup team representatives

References

External links
 
 
 

1938 births
2019 deaths
Rhodesian male tennis players
Rhodesian emigrants to the United States
Sportspeople from Harare
Alumni of Prince Edward School